LeCharls Barnet McDaniel (born October 15, 1958) is an American football coach and former cornerback who played in the National Football League (NFL) for the Washington Redskins and the New York Giants.

Early life and college 
He played high school football at Seaside High School. LeCharls played college football at California Polytechnic State University, where he earned his bachelor's degree in social science and was also a contributor on the team that won the 1980 Division II National Championship.

He redshirted in 1976, played sparingly in 1977, and then was a three-year starter at Cal Poly from 1978 through 1980. As a Mustang, he intercepted 13 passes and scored three touchdowns while serving as a team captain twice.

NFL career 
McDaniel spent his first two pro seasons, 1981 and 1982, with Washington. He intercepted one pass in the regular season, recording a 7-yard return during a 28-0 Washington rout of then-St. Louis on January 2, 1983.

He then played for the New York Giants in 1983 and 1984.

Coaching 
McDaniel began his coaching career in 1986, and coached almost the next 30 years either in college or pro capacities, assigned to defensive backs, wide receivers and special teams.

References

1958 births
Living people
Sportspeople from Fayetteville, North Carolina
American football cornerbacks
Cal Poly Mustangs football players
Washington Redskins players
New York Giants players
San Diego State Aztecs football coaches
People from Fort Bragg, North Carolina